Vezendan (also Romanized as Vezendān and Vazandān) is a village in Pish Khowr Rural District, Pish Khowr District, Famenin County, Hamadan Province, Iran. At the 2016 census, its population was 97, in 32 families.

gallery

References 

Populated places in Famenin County